Villupuram Junction - விழுப்புரம் சந்திப்பு is a railway station in Villupuram, Tamil Nadu. Being a prominent railway station, it serves as the distribution point of rail traffic from Chennai, the state capital of Tamil Nadu, towards the southern and central parts of the state. It is the third largest junction by number of branch lines in the state of Tamil Nadu after Salem junction,Tiruchchirapalli Junction .  It is one of the A Grade train stations in Tamil Nadu.

Location and layout
The Railway lines can be easily crossed with the help of two mass structured over bridges.
The railway station is located off the East Pondy Road in the Keelperumpakkam neighborhood. Several landmark places such as Railway mixed high school, Aringar Anna Science & Arts College, Municipal Ground, Government Hospital Building, and TNEB Block are located at close proximity from the station.

Lines
Five railway lines branch out of the Viluppuram Junction railway station.

 Double electrified BG (broad-gauge) line towards  via Chengalpattu Junction.
 Double electrified BG (broad-gauge) line towards Tiruchchirapalli Junction via Virudhachalam Junction and Ariyalur. Electrification work was completed in 2009. Also called "Chord Line" to Tiruchirapalli.
Also called as main line
 Single electrified BG (broad-gauge) line to Puducherry.

Gauge conversion was underway in 2010, making rail traffic even heavier.  Villupuram Junction has been undergone a massive infrastructure upgrade to handle this traffic.

Railway lines

Other railway stations in Villupuram district 
 Kandambakkam (KDMK)
 Mundiyampakkam (MYP)
 Valavanur (VRA)
 Serndanur (SJR)
 Venkatesapuram (VKM)
 Vikravandi (VVN)
 Thiruvennainallur (TNVL)
 Mailam (MTV)
 Parikkal (PRKL)
 Mambalapattu (MMP)
 Perani (PEI)
 Chinnababusamudram (CBU)
 Ulundurpet (ULU)
 Perani (PEI)
 Olakur (OLA)
 Tindivanam (TMV)
 Tirukoilur (TRK)
 Mepuliyur (MPR)
 Teli (TELI)
 Ayandur (AYD)
 Mugaiyur (MUY)

References

External links 

 Southern Railways - Official Website
 

Trichy railway division
Railway stations in Viluppuram district
Railway junction stations in Tamil Nadu